Please Pass the Guilt is a Nero Wolfe detective novel by Rex Stout, published by the Viking Press in 1973.  Unusually for a Nero Wolfe story, which mostly take place very near the time of publication, this novel is set in 1969, though it was originally published in 1973.

Plot introduction

As a favor to Dr. Edwin Vollmer, Wolfe agrees to find information about a case from Vollmer's friend's crisis intervention center.  A man with the alias "Ronald Seaver" has attended the clinic, given no information, but spoken of having blood on his hands no one can see.  Through trickery, Wolfe and Goodwin learn that this man is actually Kenneth Meer, an employee at the CAN broadcast network.  An executive at the network, Peter Odell, has been killed in a bomb attack.  Odell's widow believes that one of his rivals murdered him, and hires Wolfe to find proof.

Publication history
1973, New York: The Viking Press, September 1973, hardcover
In his limited-edition pamphlet, Collecting Mystery Fiction #10, Rex Stout's Nero Wolfe Part II, Otto Penzler describes the first edition of Please Pass the Guilt: "Black boards, red cloth spine; front and rear covers blank; spine stamped with gold. Issued in a mainly black and brown pictorial dust wrapper."
In April 2006, Firsts: The Book Collector's Magazine estimated that the first edition of Please Pass the Guilt had a value of between $60 and $100. The estimate is for a copy in very good to fine condition in a like dustjacket.
1973, New York: Viking (Mystery Guild), November 1973, hardcover
The far less valuable Viking book club edition may be distinguished from the first edition in three ways:
 The dust jacket has "Book Club Edition" printed on the inside front flap, and the price is absent (first editions may be price clipped if they were given as gifts).
 Book club editions are sometimes thinner and always taller (usually a quarter of an inch) than first editions.
 Book club editions are bound in cardboard, and first editions are bound in cloth (or have at least a cloth spine).
1974, New York: Bantam #Q-8472, October 1974, paperback
1974, London: Collins Crime Club, 1974, hardcover
1974, London: Book Club Associates, 1972
1975, Glasgow: Fontana #3668, 1975, paperback
1995, New York: Bantam Books  January 2, 1995, paperback
1999, Newport Beach, California: Books on Tape, Inc.  March 8, 1999, audio cassette (unabridged, read by Michael Prichard)
2010, New York: Bantam  July 21, 2010, e-book

The unfamiliar word
"Nero Wolfe talks in a way that no human being on the face of the earth has ever spoken, with the possible exception of Rex Stout after he had a gin and tonic," said Michael Jaffe, executive producer of the A&E TV series, A Nero Wolfe Mystery. "Readers of the Wolfe saga often have to turn to the dictionary because of the erudite vocabulary of Wolfe and sometimes of Archie," wrote Rev. Frederick G. Gotwald.

Nero Wolfe's vocabulary is one of the hallmarks of the character. Examples of unfamiliar words — or unfamiliar uses of words that some would otherwise consider familiar — are found throughout the corpus, often in the give-and-take between Wolfe and Archie.

 Amphigoric, chapter 12.
 Subreption, chapter 18.
 Cynosure, chapter 18.
 Concupiscence, chapter 19.

References

External links

1973 American novels
Nero Wolfe novels by Rex Stout
Viking Press books
Fiction set in 1969